Carex distracta is a tussock-forming species of perennial sedge in the family Cyperaceae. It is native to Assam in India.

The species was first described by the botanist Charles Baron Clarke in 1894 as a part of the Joseph Dalton Hooker work The Flora of British India.

See also
List of Carex species

References

distracta
Flora of Assam (region)
Plants described in 1894
Taxa named by Charles Baron Clarke